The Quenera Nature Reserve is a nature reserve in the Wild Coast region of the Eastern Cape. It is situated on the last bend of the Quenera River, covering the estuary before joining with the Amathole Offshore Marine Protected Area.

History 
This 80.79 ha reserve was created in 1988 along with the Nahoon Nature Reserve for the conservation of the region's fauna and flora.

See also 

 List of protected areas of South Africa

References 

Nature reserves in South Africa
Eastern Cape Provincial Parks